Sparganothina hermosa is a species of moth of the family Tortricidae. It is found in Napo Province, Ecuador.

The wingspan is about 30 mm. The ground colour of the forewings is golden yellow, suffused with orange rust along the costa and termen. The markings are rust brown. The hindwings are creamish, suffused and reticulated brownish orange except for the base.

Etymology
The species name refers to the colouration of the wings and is derived from Greek hermos (meaning beautiful).

References

Moths described in 2010
Sparganothini
Moths of South America
Taxa named by Józef Razowski